St. Michael's Cemetery is a cemetery in Pensacola, Florida. The land around the current location of the cemetery has been used as a burial ground beginning in the mid to late 18th century, with the earliest above-ground markers associated with Pensacola’s Second Spanish Period.

In 1949, the cemetery was dedicated as a state park.

History 
The oldest recorded burial ground in Pensacola comes from a 1778 map, showing the ground to be Northeast of St. Michael's in the vicinity of Tarragona and Chase Streets.

After officially being designated a cemetery by King Charles IV of Spain in 1807, it was moved to the south and east, and was formally platted out by Vincente Pintado in 1810. The oldest extant marker of the site dates to 1812. 

An 1827 map shows the grounds stretching from Romana Street bordering its north side and Gregory Street at its south, though an 1885 sketch shows the grounds very reminiscent of its current size.

Although originally designated for Catholic inhabitants, the cemetery has traditionally served as a burial ground for people of all faiths. As Pensacola has drawn immigrants from around the world, it is the resting place of Captains of Industry, victims of Yellow Fever epidemics and steam ship explosions, along with those who died in child birth, as infants, and of old age. 

In 1949, the cemetery was officially dedicated as a state park. 

Today, the cemetery has about 3,200 marked graves, excluding many unmarked graves, and is primarily maintained by St. Michael's Cemetery Foundation of Pensacola, Inc., a non-profit organization working with the University of West Florida. The cemetery is currently 8 acres, and is located at 6 N. Alcaniz St.

Notable burials 
 Ebenezer Dorr, U.S. Marshall for the western District of the Territory of Florida, first Sheriff of Escambia County
 Manuel Gonzalez, Justice of the Peace and Quartermaster General for the Florida Militia
 Stephen R. Mallory, Confederate States Secretary of the Navy
 José Noriega, first Alcade of Pensacola
 Salvador T. Pons, first black mayor of Pensacola
 Daniel and Martin Sullivan, successful lumber businessman
 Dorothy Walton, wife of George Walton
 P. K. Yonge, businessman and civic leader

References 

Historic American Landscapes Survey in Florida
Tourist attractions in Pensacola, Florida
Cemeteries in Florida
National parks in Florida